Senator Benton may refer to:

Members of the United States Senate
Thomas Hart Benton (politician) (1782–1858), U.S. Senator from Missouri from 1821 to 1851
William Benton (politician) (1900–1973), U.S. Senator from Connecticut from 1949 to 1953

United States state senate members
Don Benton (born 1957), Washington State Senate
Nathaniel S. Benton (1792–1869), New York State Senate